Fang Wan-ling (born 1 December 1999) is a Taiwanese weightlifter. She represented Chinese Taipei at the 2020 Summer Olympics in Tokyo, Japan. She finished in 4th place in the women's 49 kg event.

In 2018, she competed in the women's 48kg event at the Asian Games held in Jakarta, Indonesia. She finished in 6th place. She also competed in the women's 49kg event at the 2018 World Weightlifting Championships held in Ashgabat, Turkmenistan.

In 2021, she finished in 6th place in the women's 49kg event at the 2020 Asian Weightlifting Championships held in Tashkent, Uzbekistan.

References

External links 
 

Living people
1999 births
Place of birth missing (living people)
Taiwanese female weightlifters
Weightlifters at the 2018 Asian Games
Asian Games competitors for Chinese Taipei
Olympic weightlifters of Taiwan
Weightlifters at the 2020 Summer Olympics
21st-century Taiwanese women